Penicillium fusisporum is a fungus species in the family Trichocomaceae. Described as new to science in 2014, it was isolated from plant leaves in China. It is closely related to Penicillium thomii var. flavescens.

See also
List of Penicillium species

References

fusisporum
Fungi described in 2014
Fungi of Asia